Leticia Torres is a paralympic athlete from Mexico competing mainly in category T52 sprint events.

Letitia has competed in five Paralympics winning a total of thirteen medals.  Her first games in 1988 were easily her most successful with winning gold in the 100m, 200m, 400m and 800m and finishing second in the 1500m to West Germany's Yolande Hansen.  In her next games in 1992 she would win bronze medals in the 100m, 200m and 400m but crowned this off with a silver in the 800m.  1996 Summer Paralympics would see her improve in the 200m to a silver with a bronze in 400m but for the first time she failed to medal in an event when finishing fifth in the 800m.  2000 would prove a low point with Letitia failing to win a medal in any of the 200m, 400m, 800m or 1500m.  She did return for the 2004 Summer Paralympics where she competed in her first field event in the Paralympics when finishing fifth in the discus but returned to medal winning in the 200m and 400m with two bronze medals.

References

Paralympic athletes of Mexico
Athletes (track and field) at the 1988 Summer Paralympics
Athletes (track and field) at the 1992 Summer Paralympics
Athletes (track and field) at the 1996 Summer Paralympics
Athletes (track and field) at the 2000 Summer Paralympics
Athletes (track and field) at the 2004 Summer Paralympics
Paralympic gold medalists for Mexico
Paralympic silver medalists for Mexico
Paralympic bronze medalists for Mexico
Living people
Medalists at the 1988 Summer Paralympics
Medalists at the 1992 Summer Paralympics
Medalists at the 1996 Summer Paralympics
Medalists at the 2004 Summer Paralympics
Year of birth missing (living people)
Paralympic medalists in athletics (track and field)
Medalists at the 2007 Parapan American Games
Mexican female wheelchair racers